Ammonium triiodide  (NH4I3) is the salt of the ammonium cation with the triiodide anion.

Sometimes the name ammonium triiodide is mistakenly used to refer to a different compound, nitrogen triiodide (NI3), or more precisely, the slightly more stable ammine, NI3 · NH3.

References

Ammonium compounds
Polyhalides